Michael McDowell (born 1 May 1951) is an Irish Independent politician and barrister who has served as a Senator for the National University since April 2016. He previously served as Tánaiste from 2006 to 2007, Minister for Justice, Equality and Law Reform from 2002 to 2007, Leader of the Progressive Democrats from 2006 to 2007 and Attorney General of Ireland from 1999 to 2002. He served as a Teachta Dála (TD) for the Dublin South-East constituency from 1987 to 1989, 1992 to 1997 and 2002 to 2007.

A grandson of Irish revolutionary Eoin MacNeill, McDowell was a founding member of the Progressive Democrats in the mid-1980s. On three occasions he was elected as a TD for the Dublin South-East constituency, serving in the 25th Dáil (1987–89), the 27th Dáil (1992–97), and the 29th Dáil (2002–07). He lost his Dáil seat at the general elections of 1989, 1997, and 2007.

McDowell led the Progressive Democrats to a disastrous performance at the 2007 general election, in which the party lost six of its eight seats in Dáil Éireann, including his own. After conceding his seat to John Gormley at the RDS count centre in Dublin, McDowell abruptly resigned as party leader and announced his immediate retirement from public life. He has since resumed his private legal career. He returned to politics in 2016 and was elected to Seanad Éireann as a Senator for the National University of Ireland.

Early life

Born in Dublin, he was educated at the Jesuit school Gonzaga College, then at University College Dublin where he became auditor of the UCD Law Society. He later attended the King's Inns in Dublin where he achieved the Barrister-at-Law degree in 1974. McDowell was a junior counsel on the legal team that defended the murderer Malcolm MacArthur in the notorious GUBU case. In 2002, McDowell excused himself from considering MacArthur's parole report, to avoid any possible conflict of interest arising from this representation. He was appointed a Senior Counsel in 1987. He became involved in politics, initially supporting Fine Gael. When Desmond O'Malley was expelled from Fianna Fáil in 1985, McDowell immediately wrote to him in support, and ended up becoming one of the people who helped him establish the Progressive Democrats. He is the husband of UCD accountancy Professor Niamh Brennan and brother of UCD economics lecturer Moore McDowell.

Political career

McDowell was one of 14 Progressive Democrat TDs elected to Dáil Éireann at the 1987 general election, the first election after the party was founded. He was elected for the Dublin South-East constituency. He lost his seat at the 1989 general election but was made chairman of the party. McDowell regained his seat at the 1992 general election but lost it again at the 1997 general election. At various times, he served as a member of the Progressive Democrats front bench in roles as spokesman for foreign affairs, Northern Ireland and finance. In July 1999, McDowell was appointed Attorney General of Ireland, a position he held until 2002. In 2000, he proposed changing the name of the party to the Radical Party.

Minister for Justice, Equality and Law Reform

Following the 2002 general election, McDowell regained his Dáil seat. This was the first time McDowell combined winning a Dáil seat with his party's entry into government. He was appointed to the cabinet as Minister for Justice, Equality and Law Reform. He was a strong opponent of the policies of Sinn Féin and the Provisional Irish Republican Army, and often took a harder line than his coalition partners, Fianna Fáil. He was named as Politician of the Year for 2004 in the Magill magazine annual awards.

In 2005, he announced plans to introduce Anti-Social Behaviour Orders, although not in the same form as those in Britain. McDowell's Intoxicating Liquor Act 2003 prohibited cut-price drinks promotions and placed restrictions on alcohol advertising, as well as making it mandatory for under-21s to have proof of age when drinking in pubs. This law also banned under-18s from pubs after 9pm, a regulation that was highly unpopular and was later relaxed to 10pm during the summer months. In 2005, McDowell proposed to grant licences for café-bars which would have a limited capacity and serve meals as well as alcohol. It was hoped that this would combat binge drinking by introducing a more European "café culture". This initiative was dropped owing to objections from publicans and members of his coalition partners, Fianna Fáil.

In 2004, he proposed a citizenship referendum to end the automatic right to Irish citizenship for all babies born on the island of Ireland. The referendum was passed with an 80% majority. The referendum was criticised by the some in the Opposition, who accused McDowell of pandering to racist elements. He reformed the private security industry, regulating it for the first time under the Private Security Services Act 2004 and establishing the Private Security Authority.

McDowell launched far-reaching reforms of the Garda Síochána and introduced severe penalties (up to five years in jail) for Gardaí who leaked information under the Garda Síochána Act 2005, after the force was extensively criticised by the Morris and Barr Tribunals and he was embarrassed by high-profile leaks of his plans for the force to newspapers from high-level Gardaí. He also introduced a voluntary ancillary branch of the police force despite huge resistance from paid employees. McDowell's Criminal Justice (Terrorist Offences) Act, 2005 on telecommunications data retention compels service providers to store all telephone, SMS and internet records for three years and provide them to Gardaí on request. The Digital Rights Ireland campaign group has filed a suit against the government in the High Court claiming that this law is a breach of the constitutional right to privacy.

His Defamation Bill of 2006 proposed a radical reform of Irish defamation law, replacing the torts of libel and slander with one single offence of "defamation" and allowing the press to plead "fair and reasonable publication" as a defence in defamation cases. Related to the defamation reforms, McDowell also proposed a new privacy law which was heavily criticised by the newspaper industry. In 2006, he established the Balance in Criminal Law Review Group, and in 2007 oversaw the enactment of their recommendation to roll back the right to silence.

Controversies

As Justice Minister, McDowell attracted a good deal of controversy:

 McDowell authorised the purchase of a farm in north Fingal, at Thornton Hall, on behalf of the state, to build a proposed prison. However this was more expensive compared to the value of similar land close by, and several state organisations already had land closer to the city which might have been used for the same purpose.
 He sped up the deportation of failed asylum seekers, including one case in 2005 where a student, Kunle Eluhanla, was deported back to Nigeria while preparing for his Leaving Certificate examinations. After a public outcry led by Eluhanla's classmates, McDowell allowed his return, but not that of others.
 In February 2005, he accused the Sinn Féin leaders Gerry Adams, Martin McGuinness and Martin Ferris of being members of the Provisional IRA Army Council. The allegations were denied by Adams, McGuinness and Ferris.
 In 2004, McDowell called killings by gangs the “sting of a dying wasp", intimating that gangland killings were coming to an end. However, there were a record number of gun killings in Ireland in 2006 (25 in total)., including five murders in six days in December. McDowell has stated that "soft" judges are partly to blame for these killings for granting bail to gang suspects despite Garda objections. These statements have caused anger in the legal profession. One unnamed legal professional described McDowell's statements as "outrageous" and "bordering on impeachable". In an unprecedented protest, dozens of senior judges boycotted a 2006 Christmas reception given by McDowell. He has been openly criticised by retired judge Fergus Flood over McDowell's remarks about the failure of judges to implement the law on bail and mandatory sentences for drug dealing. Flood said the judiciary must have the right to consider each individual case as appropriate and that McDowell should consider the context of his remarks before making statements.
 In May 2005, when addressing the Oireachtas Justice Committee, he made a number of comments insinuating that most asylum seekers were not legally entitled to stay in Ireland and regretting his inability to deport them forthwith because of due process.
 On 13 December 2005, using Dáil privilege, he claimed that Frank Connolly, an investigative journalist and a brother of one of the 'Colombia Three', had travelled to Colombia under a false passport. McDowell subsequently leaked the alleged faked passport application to a friend, the journalist Sam Smyth of the Irish Independent. McDowell was widely accused of abusing his power as Minister for Justice for political purposes, and prejudicing any potential police investigation. Although Connolly denied McDowell's accusations, the controversy led to Irish American private donor Chuck Feeney withdrawing funding from the Centre for Public Inquiry, an investigative organisation which had published two reports embarrassing the government, of which Frank Connolly was the director, after McDowell met with him.
 On 20 March 2006, he apologised for calling the Opposition spokesperson on Finance, Richard Bruton, TD, "the Joseph Goebbels of Irish political life". He had made these remarks after Bruton had highlighted to the Dáil that despite McDowell's claims of increases in Garda personnel in 2005, only 6 extra Gardaí had been added to the Dublin police force in that year. McDowell maintained that Bruton specifically chose to compare dates that did not accurately reflect a general increase in Garda numbers. He apologised for the remarks on the "Morning Ireland" radio programme on RTÉ the next day.
 In March 2006, he falsely claimed that Green Party 'people' were responsible for vandalising Progressive Democrats headquarters. He later withdrew the comment, but then appeared to repeat it again.
 In May 2006, the Supreme Court of Ireland struck down the law on statutory rape as unconstitutional as it did not allow an individual accused to enter the defence of reasonable belief that the victim was of age. The Supreme Court's decision surprised the whole country, and in the aftermath, McDowell was widely criticised for failing to anticipate the decision.
 On 27 September 2006, he criticised the Taoiseach Bertie Ahern for accepting money from businessmen in 1993 and 1994, calling it unethical and an error of judgement and said that the money must be repaid with interest. The statement was greeted with derision by the Opposition, with Fine Gael claiming it was motivated by the Progressive Democrats determination to keep Fianna Fáil in power. Labour Party leader Pat Rabbitte said the Progressive Democrats were now handcuffed to Fianna Fáil for the duration of this Dáil, and that there might as well be single-party Government.
On 6 March 2007, McDowell apologised to the Dáil for omissions from an Act that he had enacted in 2006 on the protection of children from sex abusers in the Second Stage debate on the Criminal Law (Sexual Offences) (Amendment) Bill 2007 in the Dáil, saying: "The primary purpose of this short Bill is to remedy an error in the Criminal Law (Sexual Offences) Act 2006. The particular point with which we are dealing was brought to my attention last week by Deputy Rabbitte, for which I thank him. It was a drafting error for which I am politically accountable and regretful."

Party leadership

In June 2006, McDowell was involved in a leadership dispute with party leader Mary Harney, over an alleged promise by Harney to step down in favour of him. The dispute appeared to have been resolved with Harney remaining as leader. On 7 September 2006, Mary Harney unexpectedly resigned as party leader and McDowell became the favourite to succeed her in the consequent leadership election.
Irish media reported on 10 September 2006 that Michael McDowell would be the sole nominee for party leadership, Liz O'Donnell would become Deputy Leader and that Tom Parlon would become Party President. On 11 September 2006 McDowell was confirmed as party leader and on 13 September 2006, he was appointed Tánaiste.

2007 general election and resignation as party leader

During the 2007 general election campaign, the Progressive Democrats erected posters bearing the slogan, "Left wing government? No thanks". This was an echo of their 2002 election campaign when they issued posters bearing the slogan; "One party government? No thanks" which then targeted Fianna Fáil. In 2007 their target was the Green Party. While McDowell was unveiling the poster during a press briefing in Ranelagh which was the site of his telegraph pole climb in the 2002 election; constituency opponent John Gormley of the Green party turned up to confront McDowell on the issue of an accompanying pamphlet which made misleading claims about the Green party. The ensuing exchange between them was dubbed the Rumble in Ranelagh by the media. During the 2007 RTÉ Television election debate, McDowell remarked on the state of the opposition parties: "I'm surrounded by the left, the hard-left and the left-overs."

Despite being a high-profile party leader, Tánaiste and Minister for Justice, McDowell's vote dropped from 6,093 (18.8%) in the 2002 general election to 4,450 (13.2%) in the 2007 general election. He was beaten for the last seat in the Dublin South-East constituency by John Gormley by a margin of 304 votes. He was the first sitting Tánaiste to lose his seat, and his subsequent departure from politics makes him the "shortest-serving political-party leader in the history of the State". He stated that his time as a public representative was over. On 25 May 2007, McDowell resigned as leader of the Progressive Democrats and announced that he was quitting politics, immediately and without consultation with his party colleagues, after losing his seat in the Dublin South-East constituency in the general election, while the party fell from eight seats to two. 

The reaction of the press was divided:
That McDowell's career in government as Tánaiste is over is partly of his own making as he courted controversy to such a fevered extent that he became the most unpopular political leader in the country.
McDowell's reforms of the prison service, the Gardaí and immigration policy are a monument to his five years as Minister for Justice. 

The then Minister for Enterprise, Trade and Employment Micheál Martin, said he was sad to learn of his cabinet colleague's decision to resign. He said he will be a significant loss, calling him a very formidable parliamentarian.

Election to Seanad Éireann
In 2016, McDowell stood for election to Seanad Éireann for the National University constituency. He was elected on the 26th count. He was re-elected to the Seanad in 2020.

Personal life
After losing his Dáil seat, McDowell returned to work as a Senior Counsel. In addition, he receives annual pension payments of €60,388, which he donates to charity. He represented the Irish Recorded Music Association in their case to force Eircom and UPC to filter their customers' Internet access and in some cases cut off their access completely.
On 21 July 2010 McDowell suggested at the McGill Summer School that The Twelfth - 12 July, celebrated by Northern Ireland Protestants in commemoration of the Battle of Aughrim (1691) and Battle of the Boyne (1690) should be a public holiday in Ireland.
He writes a weekly column in the Irish Times.

References

1951 births
Living people
Alumni of University College Dublin
Attorneys General of Ireland
Irish Senior Counsel
Leaders of Progressive Democrats
Members of the 25th Dáil
Members of the 27th Dáil
Members of the 29th Dáil
Members of the 25th Seanad
Ministers for Justice (Ireland)
People educated at Gonzaga College
Politicians from Dublin (city)
Progressive Democrats TDs
Tánaistí
Independent members of Seanad Éireann
Military personnel from Dublin (city)
Members of Seanad Éireann for the National University of Ireland
Alumni of King's Inns
Members of the 26th Seanad
People from Ranelagh